Story of My Death is a film directed by Albert Serra. It won the Golden Leopard at the 2013 Locarno International Film Festival.

Reception
The film won the Golden Leopard at the 2013 Locarno International Film Festival.

On review aggregator website Rotten Tomatoes, the film has an approval rating of 75% based on 12 reviews, and an average rating of 8.8/10. On Metacritic, the film has a weighted average score of 80 out of 100, based on 6 critics, indicating "generally favorable reviews".

References

External links

Golden Leopard winners
2013 drama films
Films directed by Albert Serra